Thomas Churchyard (born Melton, near Woodbridge, Suffolk in 1798, died 1865) was an English lawyer and painter of Woodbridge. He was trained as a solicitor, and worked in the law for many years, but his real interest was landscape painting. He married Harriet Hailes of Melton in 1825, and they had two sons and six daughters who survived to adulthood (but none of whom prospered). Thomas was a long-term friend of Edward FitzGerald, the translator of Omar Khayyam's Rubaiyat.

Further reading
Painting the Day: Thomas Churchyard of Woodbridge, by Wallace Morfey (Boydell & Brewer, 1986) .

External links

Biography of Thomas Churchyard, the Suffolk artist
Thomas Churchyard on "Visit Woodbridge" site

1798 births
1865 deaths
19th-century English painters
English male painters
People from Woodbridge, Suffolk
19th-century English male artists